Charles Pickard Ware (1840–1921), was an American educator and music transcriber. An abolitionist, he served as a civilian administrator in the Union Army, where he was a labor superintendent of freedmen on plantations at Port Royal, South Carolina, during the American Civil War. This included Seaside Plantation. It is here that he transcribed many slave songs with tunes and lyrics, later published in Slave Songs of the United States, which he edited with William Francis Allen and Lucy McKim Garrison. It was the first published collection of American folk music.

Ware was also an educator in Boston, Massachusetts.

References

William Francis Allen, Charles Pickard Ware and Lucy McKim Garrison, Slave Songs of the United States,  1867, New York
Manuscript Papers of Charles Pickard Ware, ca. 1862 - 1907 resides at Howard University, Moorland-Spingarn Research Center, Washington D.C.
Elizabeth Ware Pearson (ed), Letters From Port Royal 1862-1868, 1906, W. B. Clarke Company, Boston. (Initials C.P.W. in this book refer to Charles Pickard Ware.)

External links
Slave Songs of the United States
Slave Songs of the United States (Retypeset)
Letters From Port Royal

1849 births
1921 deaths
People of the American Civil War
People from Port Royal, South Carolina